The following is a list of sports venues named after individuals:

Albania
 Qemal Stafa Stadium in Tirana
 Loro Boriçi Stadium in Shkodër
 Ruzhdi Bizhuta Stadium in Elbasan
 Selman Stërmasi Stadium in Tirana
 Niko Dovana Stadium in Durrës
 Roza Haxhiu Stadium in Lushnjë
 Adush Muça Stadium in Ballsh
 Loni Papuçiu Stadium in Fier

Algeria
 Stade Ahmed Kaïd in Tiaret

Antigua
 Stanford Cricket Ground in St. John's
 Sir Vivian Richards Stadium in North Sound

Argentina
Alphabetized by family name of the stadium's namesake.
 José Amalfitani Stadium in Buenos Aires 
 Estadio Alberto J. Armando (aka La Bombonera) in Buenos Aires
 Estadio Raúl Conti in Puerto Madryn
 Estadio Monumental José Fierro in Tucumán
 Autódromo Juan y Oscar Gálvez in Buenos Aires
 Estadio Monumental Antonio V. Liberti (aka El Monumental) in Buenos Aires
 Estadio Brigadier General Estanislao López in Santa Fe
 Estadio Padre Ernesto Martearena in Salta
 Estadio José María Minella in Mar del Plata

Aruba
 Trinidad Stadium in Oranjestad

Austria
 Arnold Schwarzenegger-Stadion, Graz – has since been renamed
 Ernst-Happel-Stadion in Vienna

Australia

 Allan Border Field in Albion
 Andy Caldecott Park in Keith
 Bill Lawry Oval
 Andrew "Boy" Charlton Pool
 Bradman Oval in Bowral
 John Grant International Raceway in Moorebank, New South Wales
 Dawn Fraser Swimming Pool
 Eric Weissel Oval
 Harold Holt Memorial Swimming Centre
 Ian Thorpe Aquatic Centre
 John Cain Arena
 Queen Elizabeth Oval in Bendigo – named after Queen Elizabeth II
 Pat Rafter Arena in Brisbane
 Rod Laver Arena in Melbourne
 Margaret Court Arena in Melbourne – named after Margaret Court
 Lathlain Park was indirectly named for Sir William Lathlain, the Lord Mayor of Perth from 1918 to 1923. The ground was named after the suburb of Lathlain, which was named after the Lord Mayor.
 Roy Henzell Oval in Caloundra
 Tony Ireland Stadium in Townsville

Azerbaijan

 Anatoliy Banishevskiy Stadium in Masally
 Heydar Aliyev Stadium in Imishli
 Ismat Gayibov Stadium in Bakikhanov
 Nariman Narimanov Stadium in Neftchala
 Tofiq Bahramov Stadium in Baku
 Yashar Mammadzade Stadium in Mingachevir

Bahamas

 Thomas Robinson Stadium in Nassau
 Roscow A. L. Davies Soccer Field in Nassau

Belgium
 Stade Charles Tondreau in Mons
 Constant Vanden Stock Stadium in Anderlecht, Brussels
 Edmond Machtens Stadium in Molenbeek-Saint-Jean
 Jan Breydel Stadium in Brugge
 Stade Joseph Marien in Brussels
 King Baudouin Stadium in Brussels
 Stade Maurice Dufrasne in Liège

Belize
 Marion Jones Sports Complex in Belize City

Benin
 Stade Charles de Gaulle in Porto-Novo

Bolivia
 Estadio Hernando Siles in La Paz

Bosnia and Herzegovina
 Asim Ferhatović Hase Stadium in Sarajevo

Brazil
 Mini Autodromo Zeca Elias in Americana City
 Estádio Mané Garrincha in Brasília
 Estádio Olímpico João Havelange in Rio de Janeiro
 Estádio Eduardo José Farah in São Paulo
 Emerson Fittipaldi Speedway in Rio de Janeiro
 Autódromo José Carlos Pace in São Paulo
 Autódromo Internacional Nelson Piquet in Rio de Janeiro
 Autódromo Internacional Nelson Piquet in Brasília
 Autódromo Internacional Ayrton Senna in Caruaru
 Autódromo Internacional Ayrton Senna in Goiânia
 Autódromo Internacional Ayrton Senna in Londrina

Brunei
 Sultan Hassanal Bolkiah Stadium in Bandar Seri Begawan

Bulgaria
 Georgi Asparuhov Stadium in Sofia
 Vasil Levski National Stadium in Sofia

Burundi
 Prince Louis Rwagasore Stadium in Bujumbura

Cameroon
 Ahmadou Ahidjo Stadium in Yaoundé

Canada
 Aréna Dave Keon in Rouyn-Noranda, Quebec
 Art Hauser Centre in Prince Albert, Saskatchewan
 Bill Copeland Sports Centre in Burnaby, British Columbia
 Arena Bill Durnan  in Montreal, Quebec
 Centre Georges Vézina in Chicoutimi, Quebec
 Charles V. Keating Millennium Centre in Antigonish, Nova Scotia
 Dave Andreychuk Mountain Arena & Skating Centre in Hamilton, Ontario
 Arena Doug Harvey  in Montreal, Quebec
 Father David Bauer Olympic Arena in Calgary, Alberta
 Frank Crane Arena in Nanaimo, British Columbia
 Circuit Gilles Villeneuve in Montreal, Quebec
 Grant Fuhr Arena in Spruce Grove, Alberta
 Centre Henry-Leonard in Baie-Comeau, Quebec
 Arena Howie Morentz  in Montreal, Quebec
 Jack Gatecliff Arena in St. Catharines, Ontario
 Aréna Jacques Plante in Shawinigan, Quebec
 Colisée Jean Béliveau in Longueuil, Quebec
 Aréna Leonard Grondin in Granby, Quebec
 Aréna Marcel-Bédard in Beauport, Quebec
 Centre Marcel Dionne in Drummondville, Quebec
 Centre Mario Gosselin in Thetford Mines, Quebec
 Arena Martin Brodeur  in Montreal, Quebec
 Maurice Richard Arena in Montreal, Quebec
 Max Bell Centre in Calgary, Alberta
 John Labatt Centre in London, Ontario
 K. C. Irving Regional Centre in Bathurst, New Brunswick
 Paul Sauvé Arena in Montreal, Quebec
 Centre Pierre Charbonneau in Montreal, Quebec
 Ray Twinney Complex in Newmarket, Ontario
 Robert Guertin Centre in Gatineau, Quebec
 Arena Roberto Luongo  in Montreal, Quebec
 Saputo Stadium in Montréal, Québec (named after the Saputo family, not the company that it controls)
 Steve Yzerman Arena in Nepean, Ontario
 Nat Bailey Stadium in Vancouver, British Columbia
 Morgan Firestone Arena in Ancaster, Ontario
 Al Palladini Community Center in Woodbridge, Ontario

Cayman Islands
 Truman Bodden Stadium in George Town

Central African Republic
 Barthelemy Boganda Stadium in Bangui

Chile
 Estadio Carlos Dittborn in Arica

China
 Ying Tung Natatorium in Beijing

Colombia
 Estadio General Santander in Cúcuta
 Estadio Metropolitano Roberto Meléndez in Barranquilla 
 Estadio Olímpico Pascual Guerrero in Cali

Comoros
 Stade Said Mohamed Cheikh in Moroni

Costa Rica
 Estadio Ricardo Saprissa Aymá in San Jose

Côte d'Ivoire
 Stade Félix Houphouët-Boigny in Abidjan

Croatia
 Dražen Petrović Basketball Hall in Zagreb

Cuba
 Estadio Augusto César Sandino in Santa Clara
 Estadio Guillermón Moncada in Santiago

Czech Republic
 Stadion Evžena Rošického in Prague
 Masaryk Circuit in Brno

Democratic Republic of the Congo
 Stade Tata Raphaël in Kinshasa

Dominican Republic
 Estadio Julián Javier in San Francisco de Macorís
 Estadio Tetelo Vargas in San Pedro de Macorís
 Estadio Francisco Micheli in La Romana

Ecuador
 Estadio Modelo Alberto Spencer Herrera in Guayaquil

Egypt
Osman Ahmed Osman Stadium in Cairo

El Salvador
Estadio Jorge "Mágico" González in San Salvador

Ethiopia
Abebe Bikila Stadium in Addis Abeda

Finland
 Arto Tolsa Areena in Kotka
 Paavo Nurmi Stadion in Turku

France
Bugatti Circuit, Le Mans
 Circuit Paul Ricard, Le Castellet, Var
 Court Philippe Chatrier, Paris
 Mini Circuit Patrick Depailler, Clermont-Ferrand
Stade Marcel-Michelin, Clermont-Ferrand
Stade de l'Abbé-Deschamps, Auxerre
Stade Aimé Giral, Perpignan
Stade Amédée-Domenech, Brive-la-Gaillarde
Stade Auguste-Bonal, Montbéliard
Stade Chaban-Delmas, Bordeaux
Stade Ernest-Wallon, Toulouse
Stade Félix-Bollaert, Lens
Stade Geoffroy-Guichard, Saint-Étienne
Stade Gilbert Brutus, Perpignan
Stade Guy Boniface, Mont-de-Marsan
Stade Jean-Bouin, Paris
Jean-Bouin Stadium, Angers
Stade Jean-Pierre Papin, Lesquin
Circuit Louis Rosier, Clermont-Ferrand
Stade Mayol, Toulon
Stade Arsène Wenger, Duppigheim
Stade Olympique Yves-du-Manoir, Colombes
Stade Yves-du-Manoir, Montpellier

Gabon
 Stade Omar Bongo in Libreville

Georgia
 Boris Paichadze Stadium, Tbilisi
 Mikheil Meskhi Stadium, Tbilisi

Germany
 Carl-Benz-Stadion in Mannheim
 Dietmar-Hopp-Stadion in Sinsheim
 Fritz-Walter-Stadion in Kaiserslautern
 Gottlieb-Daimler-Stadion in Stuttgart
 Gunda Niemann-Stirnemann Halle in Efurt
 Max-Schmeling-Halle in Berlin
 Motorsportarena Stefan Bellof in Buseck

Ghana
 Ohene Djan Stadium in Accra

Greece
 Spiros Louis Stadium in Athens

Guadeloupe
 Stade René Serge Nabajoth in Les Abymes

Guatemala
 Estadio Mateo Flores in Guatemala City

Haiti
Stade Sylvio Cator in Port-au-Prince

Honduras
 Estadio Francisco Morazán in San Pedro Hula

Hong Kong
 Queen Elizabeth Stadium in Morrison Hill

Hungary
 Ferenc Puskás Stadium in Budapest

India
 Atal Bihari Vajpayee Stadium in Nadaun 
 Anna Stadium in Tiruchirappalli
 Baichung Stadium in Namchi
 Bakhshi Stadium in Srinagar
 Barkatullah Khan Stadium in Jodhpur
 Bhim Rao Ambedkar International Sports Stadium in Lucknow
 Basawan Singh Indoor Stadium in Hajipur
 Bhamashah Stadium in Meerut
 Bhausaheb Bandodkar Ground in Margao
 Bilakhiya Stadium in Vapi
 Birsa Munda Athletics Stadium in Ranchi
 Birsa Munda Football Stadium in Ranchi
 Birsa Munda Hockey Stadium in Ranchi
 Brabourne Stadium in Mumbai
 Buddh International Circuit in Noida
 CN Annadurai Stadium (proposed) in Coimbatore
 Captain Roop Singh Stadium in Gwalior
 CB Patel International Cricket Stadium in Surat
 Chandrasekharan Nair Stadium in Thiruvananthapuram
 Chatrapati Shivaji Stadium in Karad
 Chaudhary Bansi Lal Cricket Stadium in Rohtak
 Dadaji Kondadev Stadium in Thane
 Dhyan Chand National Stadium in New Delhi
 Dhyan Chand Astroturf Stadium in Lucknow
 Dhruve Pandove Stadium in Patiala
 Dilip Tirkey Stadium in Rourkela
 Dr. Amdekar Stadium in Bijapur
 Dr. Akhilesh Das Stadium in Lucknow
 Dr. Bhupen Hazarika Cricket Stadium in Guwahati
 Dr. Karni Singh Shooting Range in Delhi
 Dr. Nagendra Jha Stadium in Darbhanga
 Dr. Rajendra Prasad Stadium in Margao
 Dr. Sampurnanda Stadium in Varanasi
 Dr. S.P. Mukherjee Swimming Stadium in Delhi
 Dr. Y.S. Rajasekhara Reddy ACA-VDCA Cricket Stadium in Visakhapatnam
 DY Patil Stadium in Navi Mumbai
 Eklavya Sports Stadium in Agra 
 Feroz Shah Kotla in Delhi
 Gandhi Sports Complex Ground in Amritsar
 Gandhi Stadium in Amritsar
 Gandhi Ground in Udaipur
 G. M. C. Balayogi Athletic Stadium in Hyderabad
 Guru Gobind Singh Stadium in Jalandhar
 Guru Nanak Stadium in Ludhiana
 Harbax Singh Stadium in Delhi
 Holkar Cricket Stadium in Indore
 Indira Gandhi International Sports Stadium in Haldwani
 Indira Gandhi Athletic Stadium in Guwahati
 Indira Gandhi Arena in Delhi
 Indira Gandhi Stadium in Orai
 Indira Gandhi Stadium in Vijayawada
 Indira Gandhi Stadium in Una
 Indira Priyadarshini Stadium in Visakhapatnam
 Irwin Stadium in Delhi
 Jawahar Municipal Stadium in Kannur
 Jawaharlal Stadium in Chennai
 Jawaharlal Stadium in Dhanbad
 Jawaharlal Stadium in Guwahati
 Jawaharlal Stadium in Kochi
 Jawaharlal Stadium in New Delhi
 Jawaharlal Stadium in Pune
 Jawaharlal Stadium in Shillong
 Jawaharlal Stadium in Tiruchirappalli
 Jawaharlal Navoday Vidhyalay Stadium in Una
 Jimmy George Indoor Stadium in Thiruvananthapuram
 JRD Tata Sports Complex in Jamshedpur
 Kari Motor Speedway in Chennai
 Karnail Singh Stadium in Delhi
 K. D. Singh Babu Stadium in Barabanki
 K. D. Singh Babu Stadium in Lucknow
 Keenan Stadium in Jamshedpur
 Kotla Vijay Bhaskar Reddy Indoor Stadium in Hyderabad
 Lal Bahadur Shastri Stadium in Hyderabad
 Lal Bahadur Shastri Stadium in Kollam
 Lalabhai Contractor Stadium in Surat
 M. Chinnaswamy Stadium in Bangalore
 M. A. Chidambaram Stadium in Chennai
 Madhavrao Scindia Cricket Ground in Rajkot
 Madan Mohan Malviya Stadium in Allahabad
 Mahabir Stadium in Hissar
 Maharaja Bir Bikram College Stadium in Agartala
 Maharaja Aggarsain Stadium in Rohtak
 Maharaja Lakshman Sen Memorial College Ground in Sundar Nagar
 Maharana Pratap Khel Gaon in Udaipur
 Mahatma Gandhi Stadium in Salem
 Maulana Azad Stadium in Jammu
 Mayor Radhakrishnan Stadium in Chennai
 MGR Race Course Stadium in Madurai
 Mohan Kumar Mangalam Stadium in Bokaro Steel City
 Moin-ul-Haq Stadium in Patna
 Narendra Modi Stadium in Ahmedabad
 Narendra Mohan Sports Stadium in Mohan Nagar
 Neelam Sanjeeva Reddy Stadium in Anantapur
 Nehru Smarak Stadium in Bhagalpur
 Nahar Singh Stadium in Faridabad
 Nehru Stadium in Coimbatore
 Nehru Stadium in Durgapur
 Nehru Stadium in Indore
 Nehru Stadium in Kottayam
 Nehru Stadium in Margao
 Nehru Stadium in Gurgaon
 Netaji Indoor Stadium in Kolkata
 NTR Stadium in Gudivada
 NTR Stadium in Hyderabad
 Pandit Deendayal Upadhyay Indoor Stadium in Surat
 Punjab Cricket Association IS Bindra Stadium in Mohali
 Rabindra Sarobar Stadium in Kolkata
 Rajarathinam Stadium in Chennai
 Rajendra Stadium in Siwan
 Rajarshi Shahu Stadium in Kolhapur
 Rajiv Gandhi International Cricket Stadium in Dehradun
 Rajiv Gandhi International Cricket Stadium in Hyderabad
 Rajiv Gandhi Stadium Mualpui in Aizawl
 Ravi Shankar Shukla Stadium in Jabalpur
 R.K. Khanna Tennis Complex in Delhi
 Sardar Vallabhbhai Patel Indoor Stadium in Mumbai
 Sardar Vallabhbhai Patel Stadium in Ahmedabad
 Sardar Vallabhbhai Patel Stadium in Valsad
 Satindra Mohan Dev Stadium in Silchar
 Sawai Mansingh Stadium in Jaipur
 SDNR Wadeyar Stadium in Maysor
 Shah Satnam Ji Stadium in Sirsa
 Shaheed Veer Narayan Singh International Cricket Stadium in Naya Raipur
 Shaheed Krishan Chand Memorial Stadium in Mandi
 Shivaji Stadium in Delhi
 Shree Shiv Chhatrapati Sports Complex in Pune
 Shri Chhatrapati Shivaji Stadium in Kolhapur
 SPM Swimming Pool Complex in New Delhi
 Subrata Roy Sahara Stadium in Pune. Now Maharashtra Cricket Association Cricket Stadium
 Sumant Moolgaokar Stadium in Jamshedpur
 Surjit Hockey Stadium in Jalandhar
 Swami Vivekananda Stadium in Agartala
 Tau Devi Lal Stadium in Gurgaon
 Tilak Maidan Stadium in Vasco da Gama
 V.K.N. Menon Indoor Stadium in Thrissur 
 VO Chidambaram Pillai Municipal Park Ground in Erode
 Wankhede Stadium in Mumbai
 Yashwant Stadium in Nagpur
 YS Raja Reddy Stadium in Cuddapah

Indonesia
 Andi Mattalata Sports Complex in Makassar
 Andi Mattalata Stadium
 Andi Mattalatta Swimming Pool
 Baharoeddin Siregar Stadium in Deli Serdang
 Barnabas Youwe Stadium in Jayapura
 Diponegoro Stadium in Banyuwangi
 Gelora B.J. Habibie Sports Complex in Parepare
 Gelora B.J. Habibie Stadium
 Gelora B.J. Habibie Sport Hall
 Gelora Bumi Kartini Stadium in Jepara
 Gelora Bung Karno Sports Complex in Jakarta
 Gelora Bung Karno Stadium
 Gelora Bung Karno Madya Stadium
 Istora Gelora Bung Karno
 Gelora Bung Karno Aquatic Stadium
 Gelora Bung Karno Tennis Indoor Stadium
 Gelora Bung Karno Tennis Outdoor Stadium
 Gelora Bung Karno Tennis Court
 Gelora Bung Karno Baseball Stadium
 Gelora Bung Karno Softball Field
 Gelora Bung Karno Basketball Hall
 Gelora Bung Karno Squash Stadium
 Gelora Bung Karno Archery Field
 Gelora Bung Karno Rugby Field
 Gelora Bung Karno Arena
 Gelora Bung Karno Gateball Court
 Gelora Bung Tomo Sports Complex in Surabaya
 Gelora Bung Tomo Stadium
 Gelora Bung Tomo Sport Hall
 Gelora Bung Tomo Circuit
 Gelora Haji Agus Salim Stadium in Padang
 Hoegeng Stadium in Pekalongan
 Kaharuddin Nasution Rumbai Stadium in Pekanbaru
 Kapten I Wayan Dipta Stadium in Gianyar
 Lukas Enembe Sports Complex in Jayapura
 Lukas Enembe Stadium
 Istora Lukas Enembe
 Lukas Enembe Aquatic Stadium
 Lukas Enembe Shooting Arena
 Munaip Saleh Velodrome in Cimahi
 Ngurah Rai Stadium in Denpasar
 Rudy Hartono Badminton Hall in Jakarta
 Sasana Emas Greysia-Apriyani in Jakarta
 Soemantri Brodjonegoro Sports Complex in Jakarta
 Soemantri Brodjonegoro Stadium
 Soemantri Brodjonegoro Sport Hall
 Soemantri Brodjonegoro Swimming Pool
 Soemantri Brodjonegoro Tennis Court
 Sultan Agung Stadium in Bantul, Yogyakarta
 Susi Susanti Sport Hall in Tasikmalaya
 Taufik Hidayat Arena in Jakarta

Iran
 Ali Daei Stadium in Ardabil

Iraq
 Franso Hariri Stadium in Arbil

Ireland
 Croke Park, Dublin
 Fitzgerald Stadium, Killarney
 MacHale Park, Castlebar
 Páirc Uí Chaoimh, Cork
 Semple Stadium, Thurles

Israel
 Teddy Kollek Memorial Stadium in Jerusalem

Italy
 PalaSojourner in Rieti
 Stadio Marc'Antonio Bentegodi in Verona
 Palasport Primo Carnera in Udine
 Circuito Internazionale L.Collari in Cassino
 L.Collari RC Raceway in Bologna
 Autodromo Enzo e Dino Ferrari in Imola
 Stadio Artemio Franchi in Florence
 Stadio Artemio Franchi – Montepaschi Arena in Siena
 Stadio Giuseppe Meazza (aka San Siro) in Milan
 Pista Olimpica di bob Eugenio Monti in Cortina d'Ampezzo
 Ongaroring in Sacile
 Autodromo Riccardo Paletti in Varano de' Melegari
 Stadio Armando Picchi in Livorno
 Road Race Riccione RC Circuit Marco Simoncelli in Riccione
 Mini Autodromo Jody Scheckter in Fiorano
 Miniautodromo Internazionale M. Rosati in Gubbio
 Stadio Ennio Tardini in Parma
 Autodromo Vallelunga Piero Taruffi in Campagnano di Roma
 Piscina Felice Scandone in Naples
 PalaBarbuto in Naples
 PalaArgento (obsolete) in Naples
 Stadio Diego Armando Maradona (formerly San Paolo) in Naples
 PalaStadera in Naples
 Stadio Partenopeo (obsolete), (aka Stadio Giorgio Ascarelli) in Naples
 Stadio Arturo Collana in Naples

Jordan
 King Abdullah Stadium in Amman

Kosovo
 Adem Jashari Olympic Stadium in Kosovska Mitrovica
 Fadil Vokrri Stadium in Prishtina

Kuwait
 Jaber Al-Ahmad International Stadium in Kuwait City

Lebanon
 Camille Chamoun Sports City Stadium in Beirut

Libya
Stad Hugo Chávez in Benina (became Martyrs of February Stadium following the uprising and civil war)

Lithuania
 S. Darius and S. Girėnas Stadium in Kaunas

Luxembourg
 Stade Josy Barthel in Luxembourg City

Macedonia
 Boris Trajkovski Sports Center in Skopje

Malaysia

 Darul Aman Stadium in Alor Star
 Darul Makmur Stadium in Pahang
 Hang Jebat Stadium in Malacca City
 Sultan Ismail Nasiruddin Shah Stadium in Kuala Terengganu
 Sultan Mohammad IV Stadium in Kota Bharu
 Sultan Mizan Zainal Abidin Stadium in Kuala Terengganu
 Tan Sri Dato Haji Hassan Yunos Stadium in Johor
 Tuanku Abdul Rahman Stadium in Paroi

Mali
 Stade Modibo Kéïta in Bamako

Mexico
 Autódromo Hermanos Rodríguez in Mexico City
 Autódromo Miguel E. Abed in Amozoc, Puebla
 Estadio de Béisbol Alberto Romo Chávez in Aguascalientes
 Estadio de Béisbol Beto Ávila in Cancún
 Eduardo Vasconcelos Stadium in Oaxaca
 Estadio de Béisbol Francisco I. Madero in Saltillo
 Estadio de Béisbol Hermanos Serdán in Puebla
 Estadio Adolfo López Mateos in Reynosa
 Estadio Benito Juárez in Oaxaca
 Estadio Emilio Ibarra Almada in Los Mochis
 Estadio Nelson Barrera in Campeche
 Estadio Alfonso Lastras in San Luis
 Estadio Carlos Iturralde in Mérida
 Estadio Coruco Díaz in Zacatepec
 Estadio Francisco Villa in Zacatecas
 Estadio Francisco Zarco in Durango
 Estadio Héroe de Nacozari in Hermosillo
 Estadio Corregidora in Querétaro
 Estadio Luis de la Fuente in Veracruz
 Estadio Marte R. Gómez in Ciudad Victoria
 Estadio Miguel Alemán in Celaya
 Estadio Nemesio Díez in Toluca
 Estadio Olímpico Benito Juárez in Ciudad Juárez
 Estadio Sergio León Chávez in Irapuato
 Estadio Víctor Manuel Reyna in Tuxtla Gutierrez
 Auditorio Benito Juárez in Los Mochis
 Auditorio Benito Juárez in Veracruz
 Auditorio Fausto Gutierrez Moreno in Tijuana
 Gimnasio Miguel Hidalgo in Puebla
 Gimnasio Olímpico Juan de la Barrera in Mexico City
 Gymnasio Manuel Bernardo Aguirre in Chihuahua
 Polifórum Benito Juárez in Cancún
 Trióvalo Bernardo Obregón in Guadalajara

Monaco
 Stade Louis II in Fontvieille

Morocco
 Stade Mohamed V in Casablanca
 Stade Larbi Benbarek in Casablanca

Myanmar
 Bogyoke Aung San Stadium in Yangon

Namibia

 Hage Geingob Rugby Stadium in Windhoek
 J. Stephanus Stadium in Keetmanshoop
 Oscar Norich Stadium in Tsumeb
 Sam Nujoma Stadium in Katutura

Netherlands

Netherlands Antilles
 Ergilio Hato Stadium in Willemstad

New Zealand

 Bert Sutcliffe Oval in Lincoln
 Cobham Oval in Whangarei
 Harry Barker Reserve in Te Hapara
 Owen Delany Park in Taupo
 Queen Elizabeth II Park in Christchurch

Nicaragua
 Dennis Martínez National Stadium in Managua

Niger
 Général Seyni Kountché Stadion in Niamey

Nigeria
 Sani Abacha Stadium in Kanu

North Korea
 Kim Il-sung Stadium in Pyongyang

Oman
 Sultan Qaboos Sports Complex in Muscat

Pakistan

 Arbab Niaz Stadium in Peshawar
 Asghar Ali Shah Cricket Stadium in Karachi
 Ayub National Stadium in Quetta
 Bahawal Stadium in Bahawalpur
 Bagh-e-Jinnah in Lahore
 Gadaffi Hockey Stadium in Karachi
 Gaddafi Stadium in Lahore
 Iqbal Stadium in Faisalabad
 Jinnah Sports Stadium in Islamabad
 Jinnah Stadium in Gujranwala
 Jinnah Stadium in Sialkot
 Niaz Stadium in Hyderabad
 Qayyum Stadium in Peshawar
 Quaid-e-Azam Stadium in Mirpur
 Shaheed Mohtarama Benazir Bhutto International Cricket Stadium in Garhi Khuda Bakhsh
 Zafar Ali Stadium in Sahiwal
 Zamir Jaffri Cricket Stadium in Jhelum

Panama
 Estadio Rommel Fernández in Panama City

Papua New Guinea
 Hubert Murray Stadium in Port Morseby

Paraguay
 Estadio General Pablo Rojas in Asunción

Peru
 Estadio Jorge Basadre in Tacna

Philippines
 Marcos Stadium in Laogag
 Rizal Memorial Sports Complex in Manila
 Ninoy Aquino Stadium
 Rizal Memorial Baseball Stadium
 Rizal Memorial Coliseum
 Rizal Memorial Stadium

Poland
 Stadion Jana Pawla II in Kraków

Portugal
 Estádio D. Afonso Henriques in Guimarães
 Estádio José Alvalade in Lisbon
 Estádio Dr. Magalhães Pessoa in Leiria
Estádio Municipal Sérgio Conceição in Coimbra

Puerto Rico
 Hiram Bithorn Stadium in San Juan
 Roberto Clemente Stadium in Carolina

Qatar

 Abdullah bin Khalifa Stadium in Doha
 Ahmed bin Ali Stadium in Al Rayyan
 Hamad bin Khalifa Stadium in Doha
 Khalifa International Stadium in Doha
 Jassim Bin Hamad Stadium in Doha
 Suheim Bin Hamad Stadium in Doha
 Saoud bin Abdulrahman Stadium in Al Wakrah
 Thani bin Jassim Stadium in Doha

Republic of the Congo
 Stade Omnisport Marien Ngouabi d'Owando in Owando

Romania

Present day stadiums:
 Stadionul Dan Păltinişanu in Timişoara
 Stadionul Anghel Iordănescu in Voluntari
 Stadionul Cătălin Hîldan in Brăneşti
 Stadionul Cornel Negoescu in Buzău
 Baza Sportivă Dan Anca in Cluj-Napoca
 Stadionul Dr. Constantin Rădulescu in Cluj-Napoca
 Stadionul Nicolae Rainea in Galați
 Stadionul Dumitru Mătărău in Ștefăneștii de Jos
 Stadionul Emil Alexandrescu in Iaşi
 Stadionul Eugen Popescu in Târgoviște
 Stadionul Florea Dumitrache in Bucharest
 Stadionul Francisc Matei in Beiuș
 Stadionul Francisc von Neuman in Arad
 Stadionul Giulești-Valentin Stănescu in Bucharest
 Stadionul Jean Pădureanu in Bistrița
 Stadionul Iftimie Ilisei in Medgidia
 Stadionul Ion Comșa in Călărași
 Stadionul Ion Oblemenco in Craiova
 Stadionul Iuliu Bodola in Oradea
 Stadionul Ladislau Bölöni in Târgu Mureș
 Stadionul Constantin Anghelache in Bacău
 Stadionul Marin Anastasovici in Giurgiu
 Stadionul Mihai Adam in Câmpia Turzii
 Stadionul Michael Klein in Hunedoara
 Stadionul Mircea Chivu in Reșița
 Stadionul Nicolae Dobrin in Pitești
 Stadionul Daniel Prodan in Satu Mare
 Stadionul Otto Greffner in Șiria
 Stadionul Vasile Enache in Modelu
 Stadionul Silviu Ploeșteanu in Brașov
 Stadionul Tudor Vladimirescu in Târgu Jiu
 Baza Sportivă Zoltan David in Galați
Former stadiums:
 Stadionul Ion Moina in Cluj-Napoca
 Stadionul Lia Manoliu in Bucharest

Russia

 Eduard Streltsov Stadium in Moscow
 Grigory Fedotov Stadium in Moscow

St. Lucia
 George Odlum Stadium in Vieux Fort

Saudi Arabia
 King Abdul Aziz Stadium in Meccah
 King Fahd International Stadium in Riyadh
 Prince Mohamed bin Fahd Stadium in Dammam

Senegal
 Stade Leopold Senghor in Dakar

Serbia
 Stadion Kralj Petar I in Belgrade
 Rajko Mitić Stadium in Belgrade
 Karađorđe Stadium in Novi Sad

Slovakia
 Štadión Antona Malatinského in Trnava

South Africa

 Chatsworth Stadium in Durban
 Charles Mopeli Stadium in Phuthaditjhaba
 Ellis Park Stadium in Johannesburg
 Harry Gwala Stadium in Pietermaritzburg
 HM Pitje Stadium in Pretoria
 King Zwelithini Stadium  in Durban 
 Jan Smuts Ground in East London
 Jan Smuts Stadium in East London
 Moses Mabhida Stadium in Durban 
 Loftus Versfeld Stadium in Pretoria
 Lucas Moripe Stadium in Pretoria
 Peter Mokaba Stadium in Polokwane
 Princess Magogo Stadium in Durban 
 Seisa Ramabodu Stadium in Bloemfontein
 SJ Smith Stadium in Durban
 Themba Senamela Stadium in Witbank

South Korea
 Guus Hiddink Stadium in Gwangju

Spain
 Coliseum Alfonso Pérez in Getafe
 Estadio Carlos Belmonte in Albacete
 Carlos Tartiere Stadium in Oviedo
 Fernando Buesa Arena in Vitoria-Gasteiz
 Estadio Fernando Torres in Fuenlabrada
 Estadio Heliodoro Rodríguez López in Tenerife
 José María Martín Carpena Arena in Málaga
 Estadi Olímpic Lluís Companys in Barcelona
 Estadio Manuel Ruiz de Lopera in Sevilla
 Estadio Ramón Sánchez Pizjuán in Sevilla
 Ricardo Tormo Circuit in Valencia
 Estadio Santiago Bernabéu in Madrid
 Vicente Calderón Stadium in Madrid

Suriname
 Ronnie Brunswijkstadion in Moengo

Sri Lanka

 Asgiriya Stadium in Kandy
 Mahinda Rajapaksa International Stadium in Hambantota
 Paikiasothy Saravanamuttu Stadium in Colombo
 R. Premadasa Stadium in Colombo
 Sugathadasa Stadium in Colombo
 Tyronne Fernando Stadium in Moratuwa
 Welagedara Stadium in Kurunegala

Sweden
 Avicii Arena in Stockholm

Syria
 Khalid ibn al-Walid Stadium in Homs

Tanzania

 Amaan Stadium in Zanzibar
 Benjamin Mkapa National Stadium in Dar es Salaam
 Sheikh Amri Abeid Memorial Stadium in Arusha

Thailand
 Bira Circuit in Pattaya

Togo
 Stade Général Eyadema in Lome

Trinidad and Tobago
 Ato Boldon Stadium in Couva
 Brian Lara Stadium in Tarouba
 Dwight Yorke Stadium in Bacolet
 Hasely Crawford Stadium in Port of Spain
 Larry Gomes Stadium in Malabar
 Manny Ramjohn Stadium in Marabella
 Marvin Lee Stadium in Tunapuna

Turkey
 Abdi Ipekçi Arena in Istanbul
 Ali Sami Yen Stadium in Istanbul
 Atatürk Olympic Stadium in Istanbul
 Hamdi Akın Sports Hall in Istanbul
 BJK İnönü Stadium in Istanbul
 İzmir Atatürk Stadium in İzmir
 Kayseri Atatürk Stadium in Kayseri
 Şükrü Saracoğlu Stadium in Istanbul

Uganda

 Mandela National Stadium in Kampala It is named after the former South African president, the late Nelson Mandela.
 Muteesa II Stadium in Kampala. It is named after Mutesa II of Buganda.

United Arab Emirates

 Hamdan Sports Complex in Dubai
 Hazza bin Zayed Stadium in Al Ain
 Khalid bin Mohammed Stadium in Sharjah
 Mohammed bin Zayed Stadium in Abu Dhabi
 Maktoum bin Rashid Al Maktoum Stadium in Dubai
 Sheikh Zayed Cricket Stadium in Abu Dhabi
 Sheikh Khalifa International Stadium in Al Ain
 Tahnoun bin Mohammed Stadium in Al Ain
 Zayed Sports City Stadium in Abu Dhabi

United Kingdom
 Adams Park in High Wycombe, England
 Amaechi Basketball Centre in Manchester, England
 Sir Chris Hoy Velodrome in  Dalmarnock, Glasgow, Scotland – named after Sir Chris Hoy
 Roger Bannister running track in Oxford, England
 John Charles Centre for Sport in Leeds, England
 Fenner's in Cambridge, England
 Ludwig Guttmann Sports Centre for the Disabled in Stoke Mandeville, England
 Harvey Hadden Stadium in Bilborough, Nottingham, England
 Redgrave Pinsent Rowing Lake in Oxfordshire
 Sharron Davies Centre in Plymouth, England
 Paula Radcliffe Athletics Stadium in Loughborough, England – named after Paula Radcliffe
 Shanaze Reade BMX Track in Crewe, England – named after Shanaze Reade
 Kassam Stadium in Oxford, England
 Madejski Stadium in Reading, England
 Casement Park in Belfast, Northern Ireland
 Queen Elizabeth Olympic Park in London, England – named after Elizabeth II

United States

Future named Major League (MLB, NFL, NBA, NHL, MLS) venues

Full names
 Rickey Henderson Field, in Oakland, California. Originally Oakland–Alameda County Coliseum
Oakland Athletics named the Coliseum field "Rickey Henderson Field" on Opening Day, April 3, 2017. Henderson also serves as a Special Assistant to the President.

Presently named Major League (MLB, NFL, NBA, NHL, MLS) venues

Full names
 Joe Louis Arena in Detroit, Michigan
 Robert F. Kennedy Memorial Stadium in Washington, D.C.

Surname only
 Lambeau Field in Green Bay, Wisconsin
 Kauffman Stadium in Kansas City
 BMO Harris Bradley Center in Milwaukee
 Turner Field in Atlanta
 Busch Memorial Stadium in St. Louis
August Busch named the stadium after himself after the original name, Budweiser Stadium, was vetoed by Major League Baseball. Since then, breweries have been allowed to directly name stadiums, and Anheuser-Busch owns the naming rights to the current Busch Stadium. The current name can be interpreted as either the family name or that of Busch Beer.
 Wrigley Field in Chicago

Formerly named Major League (MLB, NFL, NBA, NHL, MLS) venues

Full names
 Hubert H. Humphrey Metrodome in Minneapolis. Demolished in 2014.
 Brendan Byrne Arena in East Rutherford, New Jersey. Later Continental Airlines Arena and Izod Center, now the non-sponsored Meadowlands Arena.
 John F. Kennedy Stadium in Philadelphia. Demolished in 1992.
 Jack Murphy Stadium in San Diego. Later known as Qualcomm Stadium and SDCCU Stadium before reverting to its original name of San Diego Stadium and being demolished in 2021.
 Joe Robbie Stadium in Miami Gardens. Now named Hard Rock Stadium.
 Ralph Wilson Stadium in Orchard Park, New York. Originally Rich Stadium, it became New Era Field in 2016. After New Era chose to exit its sponsorship contract early, the stadium became Bills Stadium in 2020 before becoming Highmark Stadium in 2021.
  Paul Brown Stadium in Cincinnati, Ohio. The stadium name was changed to Paycor Stadium on August 9, 2022, prior to the first preseason home game in 2022.

Surname only
 Jacobs Field in Cleveland, now Progressive Field.
 Kiel Center in St. Louis, later Savvis Center and Scottrade Center, now Enterprise Center.
 Wrigley Field in Chicago, Illinois
 Shibe Park, also known as Connie Mack Stadium, in Philadelphia
 Crosley Field in Cincinnati
 Comiskey Park and New Comiskey Park in Chicago. The latter is now Guaranteed Rate Field.
 Ebbets Field in Brooklyn, New York
 Forbes Field in Pittsburgh
 Griffith Stadium in Washington, D.C.
 Muehlebach Field aka Ruppert Stadium (aka Municipal Stadium) in Kansas City
 Navin Field aka Briggs Stadium aka Tiger Stadium in Detroit
 Sick's Stadium in Seattle
 Robison Field in St. Louis
 Shea Stadium in Flushing, Queens, New York

Presently named Minor League, and other significant sports venues

Full name

Indoor
 Bryce Jordan Center in University Park, Pennsylvania
 Bud Walton Arena in Fayetteville, Arkansas
 Cam Henderson Center in Huntington, West Virginia
 Charlotte Y. Martin Centre in Spokane, Washington
 Dean E. Smith Student Activities Center in Chapel Hill, North Carolina
 Donald L. Tucker Center in Tallahassee, Florida
 Harry A. Gampel Pavilion in Storrs, Connecticut
 James H. Hilton Coliseum in Ames, Iowa
 John F. Kennedy Civic Arena in Rome, New York
 Joseph J. Gentile Arena in Chicago
 Lawrence Joel Veterans Memorial Coliseum in Winston-Salem, North Carolina
 The Sandy and John Black Pavilion at Ole Miss in Oxford, Mississippi
 Tsongas Center in Lowell, Massachusetts
 Pete Maravich Assembly Center in Baton Rouge, Louisiana
 Silvio O. Conte Forum in Newton, Massachusetts
 William D. Mullins Memorial Center in Amherst, Massachusetts
 Winfield Dunn Center in Clarksville, Tennessee

Outdoor
 Arthur W. Perdue Stadium in Salisbury, Maryland
 Ben Hill Griffin Stadium in Gainesville, Florida
 Bob Ford Field in Albany, New York (set to open in 2013)
 Bobby Bowden Field at Doak Campbell Stadium in Tallahassee, Florida
 Boone Pickens Stadium in Stillwater, Oklahoma
 C. O. Brown Stadium in Battle Creek, Michigan
 Calvin Falwell Field in Lynchburg, Virginia
 Cliff Hagan Stadium in Lexington, Kentucky
 Daniel S. Frawley Stadium in Wilmington, Delaware
 David Booth Kansas Memorial Stadium in Lawrence, Kansas
 Davis Wade Stadium in Starkville, Mississippi
 Dr. Mark & Cindy Lynn Stadium in Louisville, Kentucky
 E.J. Block Athletic Field in East Chicago, Indiana
 Ed Smith Stadium in Sarasota, Florida
 Edward A. LeLacheur Park in Lowell, Massachusetts
 Ernie Shore Field in Winston-Salem, North Carolina
 G. Richard Pfitzner Stadium in Woodbridge, Virginia
 H. P. Hunnicutt Field in Princeton, West Virginia
 Hank Aaron Stadium in Mobile, Alabama
 Harry C. Pohlman Field in Beloit, Wisconsin
 Harry Grove Stadium in Frederick, Maryland
 Herschel Greer Stadium in Nashville, Tennessee
 Homer Stryker Field in Kalamazoo, Michigan
 Howard J. Lamade Stadium in South Williamsport, Pennsylvania
 Hunter Wright Stadium in Kingsport, Tennessee
 Jack Trice Stadium in Ames, Iowa
 Jackie Robinson Ballpark in Daytona Beach, Florida
 Jerry Kindall Field at Frank Sancet Stadium in Tucson, Arizona
 Jim Patterson Stadium in Louisville, Kentucky
 Joan C. Edwards Stadium in Huntington, West Virginia
 Joe O'Brien Field in Elizabethton, Tennessee
 Joe W. Davis Stadium in Huntsville, Alabama
 John O'Donnell Stadium in Davenport, Iowa
 John Thurman Field in Modesto, California
 Joker Marchant Stadium in Lakeland, Florida
 Joseph L. Bruno Stadium in Troy, New York
 Joseph P. Riley Jr. Park in Charleston, South Carolina
 Kinnick Stadium in Iowa City, Iowa
 Maimonides Park in Brooklyn, New York – While it received its current name via a sponsorship deal with the local Maimonides Medical Center, the hospital was named after the famed medieval philosopher and rabbi Moses ben Maimon, known to the Western world as Maimonides.
 Alex Rodriguez Park at Mark Light Field in Coral Gables, Florida
 Nelson W. Wolff Municipal Stadium in San Antonio, Texas
 Philip B. Elfstrom Stadium in Geneva, Illinois
 Roger Dean Stadium in Jupiter, Florida
 Sam Lynn Ballpark in Bakersfield, California
 Stanley Coveleski Regional Stadium in South Bend, Indiana
 Senator Thomas J. Dodd Memorial Stadium in Norwich, Connecticut
 Tom Tellez Track at Carl Lewis International Complex in Houston, Texas
 Tony and Nancy Moye Football and Lacrosse Complex in Macon, Georgia
 Wendell & Vickie Bell Soccer Complex in Lexington, Kentucky

Surname only

Indoor
 Alfond Arena in Orono, Maine
 Allen Fieldhouse in Lawrence, Kansas
 Beasley Performing Arts Coliseum in Pullman, Washington
 Breslin Student Events Center in East Lansing, Michigan
 Carver–Hawkeye Arena in Iowa City, Iowa
 Crisler Center in Ann Arbor, Michigan
 Finneran Pavilion in Villanova, Pennsylvania
 Galen Center in Los Angeles, California
 Huff Hall in Champaign, Illinois
 The Liacouras Center in Philadelphia, Pennsylvania
 McCarthey Athletic Center in Spokane, Washington
 McLeod Center in Cedar Falls, Iowa
 Neville Arena in Auburn, Alabama
 Pauley Pavilion in Los Angeles, California
 Resch Center in Green Bay, Wisconsin
 Rupp Arena in Lexington, Kentucky
 St. John Arena in Columbus, Ohio
 Thompson–Boling Arena in Knoxville, Tennessee
 Yost Ice Arena in Ann Arbor, Michigan

Outdoor
 Alfond Stadium in Orono, Maine
 Beaver Stadium in State College, Pennsylvania
 Blair Field in Long Beach, California
 Bosse Field in Evansville, Indiana
 Bowman Field in Williamsport, Pennsylvania
 Breese Stevens Field in Madison, Wisconsin
 Bryant–Denny Stadium in Tuscaloosa, Alabama
 Calfee Park in Pulaski, Virginia
 Campanelli Stadium in Brockton, Massachusetts
 Cashman Field in Las Vegas
 Cheney Stadium in Tacoma, Washington
 Cobb Field in Billings, Montana
 Cohen Stadium in El Paso, Texas
 Cooper Stadium in Columbus, Ohio (slated to be replaced in 2008)
 Damaschke Field in Oneonta, New York
 DeVault Memorial Stadium in Bristol, Virginia
 Dickey-Stephens Park in North Little Rock, Arkansas
 Disch–Falk Field in Austin, Texas
 Doubleday Field in Cooperstown, New York
 Dwyer Stadium in Batavia, New York
 Elliot Ballpark in Storrs, Connecticut
 Evans Diamond in Berkeley, California
 Fleming Stadium in Wilson, North Carolina
 Foster Field in San Angelo, Texas
 Fraser Field in Lynn, Massachusetts
 Frawley Stadium in Wilmington, Delaware
 Goodwin Field in Fullerton, California
 Goss Stadium at Coleman Field in Corvallis, Oregon
 Grayson Stadium in Savannah, Georgia
 Growden Memorial Park in Fairbanks, Alaska
 Hadlock Field in Portland, Maine
 Hammond Stadium in South Fort Myers, Florida
 Hammons Field in Springfield, Missouri
 Holman Stadium in Nashua, New Hampshire
 Holman Stadium in Vero Beach, Florida
 Jordan–Hare Stadium in Auburn, Alabama
 Kenan Memorial Stadium in Chapel Hill, North Carolina
 Kindrick Legion Field in Helena, Montana
 Kinnick Stadium in Iowa City, Iowa
 Lawrence–Dumont Stadium in Wichita, Kansas
 McColl–Richardson Field in Charlotte, North Carolina
 McCormick Field in Asheville, North Carolina
 McCoy Stadium in Pawtucket, Rhode Island
 Miller Motorsports Park, Tooele, Utah
 Neyland Stadium in Knoxville, Tennessee
 O'Brate Stadium in Stillwater, Oklahoma
 O'Brien Field in Peoria, Illinois
 Packard Stadium in Tempe, Arizona
 Raley Field in Sacramento, California
 Rentschler Field in East Hartford, Connecticut
 Rice-Eccles Stadium in Salt Lake City
 Ripken Stadium in Aberdeen, Maryland
 Roebling Road Raceway in Effingham County, Georgia
 Sanford Stadium in Athens, Georgia
 Vaught–Hemingway Stadium in Oxford, Mississippi
 Williams-Brice Stadium in Columbia, South Carolina
 Yulman Stadium in New Orleans, Louisiana

Full name and surname only 
These venues bear the full name of at least one person and the surname only of at least one different person. This most often occurs when a university adds the name of a new donor or other significant figure to an existing venue.

Outdoor 
 Bobby Dodd Stadium at Historic Grant Field in Atlanta, Georgia
 Dudy Noble Field, Polk–DeMent Stadium in Starkville, Mississippi
 Phil Hurd Raceway in Savannah, Georgia

Formerly named minor league and other significant use sports venues
 Al Lopez Field in Tampa (spring training)
 Calvin Griffith Park in Charlotte, North Carolina
 Crutcher Scott Field in Abilene, Texas
 Dillon Stadium in Hartford, Connecticut
 Jerry Uht Park in Erie, Pennsylvania
 Jim Crockett Memorial Park in Charlotte, North Carolina
 Johnny Rosenblatt Stadium in Omaha, Nebraska
 John Eleuthère du Pont Pavilion in Villanova, Pennsylvania
 Louis J. Tullio Arena in Erie, Pennsylvania
 Ralph Munroe Marine Stadium in Miami
 Ray Winder Field in Little Rock, Arkansas
 Robert B. Sutton Stadium in Tulsa, Oklahoma
 Tim McCarver Stadium in Memphis, Tennessee
 Thorp Raceway in Pomona, California

Uruguay
 Estadio Luis Franzini in Montevideo
 Jardines del Hipódromo María Mincheff de Lazaroff Stadium in Montevideo

Venezuela
 Estadio Luis Aparicio El Grande in Maracaibo
 Estadio Alfonso Chico Carrasquel in Puerto la Cruz

Zambia

 Arthur Davies Stadium in Kitwe
 Dag Hammarskjöld Stadium in Ndola
 Edwin Imboela Stadium in Lusaka
 Levy Mwanawasa Stadium in Ndola

See also
 List of sports venues with sole naming rights

References

Sports venues
Named after individuals
Sports venues named after individuals